"Russian Ballet" is a song by Magic Eight Ball released as a digital single in support of their debut album Sorry We're Late But We're Worth The Wait. It contains an acoustic version of the band's song "Big Star" on the B-side.

Music video 
A music video directed by Emil Kunda & Baz Francis was released for the single.

Track listing

Personnel

Musicians 
 Baz Francis: All vocals, guitars and bass
 Jason Bowld: Drums

Production 
 Dave Draper - Mixing & Mastering, Production, Additional guitar arrangement on 'Russian Ballet (Русский балет)
 Baz Francis - Production
 Executive Producer - Donnie Vie

Art direction 
 Emil Kunda - Music video Directing, Editing, Filming
 Baz Francis - Single Artwork, Music video directing. 
 Karol Łakomiec - Filming
 Sandra Sventina - Shoot assistance
 Kay Dougan - Shoot Assistance
 Andrea Duarte - Single Artwork

References 

2013 singles
2013 songs